GTR may refer to:

Transportation
 Great River Railroad, in Mississippi, US
 Grand Trunk Railway, a defunct North American railway
 Golden Triangle Regional Airport (IATA and FAA LID codes), serving Columbus, Mississippi, US
 Govia Thameslink Railway, a British railway operator
 GTR Euroseries, a short-lived European auto racing series
 Global Technical Regulations, a 1998 multinational agreement regarding vehicle regulations

Automobiles
 Gran Turismo (racing), a type of sports car
 BMW M3 GTR
 Holden Torana GTR
 Isuzu Bellett GT-R
 Mazda Familia GT-R
 McLaren F1 GTR
 McLaren P1 GTR
 Mercedes-AMG GT R
 Mercedes-Benz CLK GTR
 Nissan Skyline GT-R
 Nissan GT-R
 Porsche 924 Carrera GTR
 Toyota Celica 2000 GTR
 Ultima GTR
 Ford Mustang GT-R concept car

Science and medicine
 Generalised time reversible, in biology
 Guided tissue regeneration, in dentistry

Video games
 GTR – FIA GT Racing Game, a video game
 GTR Evolution, a video game
 GTR Group, owner of the defunct video game company Mad Catz

Other uses
 GTR (band), a British rock band
 GTR (album), their sole official studio album
 Gateway to Research (Gtr), UK research information portal
 GTR-18 Smokey Sam, an American SAM training rocket
 Green tree reservoir, flooded forest land

See also
 GT (disambiguation)